Ledsham is a civil parish in Cheshire West and Chester, England. It contains seven buildings that are recorded in the National Heritage List for England as designated listed buildings, all of which are at Grade II. This grade is the lowest of the three gradings given to listed buildings and is applied to "buildings of national importance and special interest". Apart from the village of Ledsham, the parish is rural. The listed buildings consist of a country house and associated structures, a farmhouse, and two farm buildings.

See also
Listed buildings in Capenhurst
Listed buildings in Ellesmere Port
Listed buildings in Puddington

References

Listed buildings in Cheshire West and Chester
Lists of listed buildings in Cheshire